Cheadle Lacrosse Club is a lacrosse club based in Cheadle, Greater Manchester, a suburb of Stockport. The club was established in 1879. Cheadle currently field four men's lacrosse teams as well as running respective junior teams.

See also
Lacrosse in England
English Lacrosse Association
Senior Flags
List of the oldest lacrosse teams

References

English lacrosse teams
Sport in the Metropolitan Borough of Stockport
Cheadle, Greater Manchester
1879 establishments in England
Lacrosse clubs established in 1879